Thiago André Barbosa better known as Thiaguinho (Presidente Prudente – São Paulo – Brazil, 11 March 1983), is a pagode singer, composer and presenter. He first gained notoriety for participating in the talent show Fama in 2002 and became famous for being a member of the musical group Exaltasamba from 2003 to 2012. In 2012, he released his first solo album and live album, "Ousadia & Alegria", selling more than 80,000 copies and earning him a Latin Grammy nomination in the Best Samba/Pagode Album category. He released his second solo album, "Outro Dia, Outra História", in 2014 which sold 40,000 copies and earned a gold record certificate. His third album, "Hey, Mundo!" was released in 2015, and was a commercial success, selling more than 160,000 copies and going double platinum. His second live video recording, "VamoQVamo" was released in 2016. In the same year, he released another album called "Tardezinha". His "Só Vem" album was released in 2017 which sold 40,000 copies and earned him another gold record. He released "Tardezinha 2" in 2017, followed by his third live recording called "Vibe" in 2020.

Story

Career 

Thiaguinho learned how to play guitar with Isabella Ribeiro and started to compose at 12 years of age. By 14, he learned how to play cavaquinho. At 15, he had already formed his first samba group, Sabe Demais, later producing the group's first CD. In 2002, he was a contestant in the talent show Fama, produced by Rede Globo. In 2003 he joined Exaltasamba, replacing former singer Chrigor. With the group he recorded ten CDs and 5 DVDs. In 2009 he participated in the recording of "O Baile do Simonal", where he performed the track "No galho do cajueiro" with group-mate Perícles. In 2010, the song "Valeu", written by him and Rodriguinho, won the Digital Music Award in the "Most Popular Music" category, the song "Valeu" was released by Exaltasamba. In 2012 he started his solo career, performing concerts at CrediCard Hall, in São Paulo, for the recording of his CD/DVD "Ousadia & Alegria". The album featured Gilberto Gil, Ivete Sangalo and soccer player Neymar. In 2014, Thiaguinho became the host of TV show "Música Boa ao Vivo" on Multishow.

In 2015, together with Péricles, Thiaguinho, Chrigor, Pinha Presidente and Izaías (all former members of Exaltasamba) he participated in the tour "A Gente Faz A Festa".

More recently, he signed a record label deal with Virgin Music.

Biography 
In 2011, during an appearance in the TV show Xuxa, he confirmed he was dating actress and fellow presenter Fernanda Souza. In February 2015, the couple got married at Igreja Nossa Senhora do Brasil, with 450 guests attending the ceremony. On October 14, 2019, the couple announced their divorce.

TV

Discography

Solo career 
All albums on this list were released by Som Livre, except 'Hey, Mundo'.

'Hey, Mundo' was launched by FVA Music Solutions

2012 Ousadia & Alegria
2013 Mais e Mais
2014 Outro Dia, Outra História 
2015 Hey, Mundo2016 #VamoQVamo2017 Tardezinha2018 Tardezinha 2 In Exaltasamba 
Here, most of the albums were released by EMI, had album released by Som Livre and Radar Records

2003 Alegrando a Massa2005 Esquema Novo2006 Todos os Sambas ao Vivo2007 Livre Pra Voar2007 Pagode do Exalta ao Vivo2009 Ao Vivo na Ilha da Magia2010 Roda de Samba do Exalta2010 25 Anos2011 Tá Vendo Aquela Lua''

External links 
Thiaguinho in Dicionário Cravo Albin da Música Popular Brasileira
 Thiaguinho in Portuguese Wikipedia
Official site

References 

Pagode musicians
21st-century composers
Brazilian male composers
Afro-Brazilian composers
Portuguese-language singers
Musicians from São Paulo (state)
Talent show contestants
People from Presidente Prudente, São Paulo
1983 births
Living people
21st-century male musicians